The Discovery of India was written by the Indian Independence leader, Jawaharlal Nehru (later India's first Prime Minister) during his incarceration in 1942–1945 at Ahmednagar Fort in present day Indian state of Maharashtra by British colonial authorities before the independence of India. The book was written in 1944 but published in 1946.

Synopsis
The journey in The Discovery of India begins from ancient history, leading up to the last years of the British Raj. Nehru uses his knowledge of the Upanishads, Vedas, and textbooks on ancient history to introduce to the reader the development of India from the Indus Valley civilization, through the changes in socio-political scenario every foreign invader brought, to the present day conditions.

Nehru was jailed for his participation in the Quit India Movement along with other Indian leaders, and he used this time to write down his thoughts and knowledge about India's history. The book provides a broad view of Indian history, philosophy and culture, as viewed from the eyes of an Indian fighting for the independence of his country. He wrote the book during his imprisonment.

In The Discovery of India, Nehru argued that India was a historic nation with a right to sovereignty. This book also analyses in depth the philosophy of Indian life. It has 10 chapters.

Other contributors

Nehru attributes some of the content of the book to his fellow prisoners at Ahmednagar jail. He gives special mention to four of them namely Maulana Abul Kalam Azad, Govind Ballabh Pant, Narendra Deva and Asaf Ali. All his fellow prisoners (eleven of them) were political prisoners from various parts of the country, having deep knowledge about the various aspects of India which the book discusses. They also participated in proofreading Nehru's work and providing him with creative suggestions.

Edition  
The book was first published from Signet Press at Calcutta (now Kolkata), India on 16 November,1946.

The book is presently published by the 'Jawaharlal Nehru Memorial Fund' and the copyright for the book is held by his grand daughter-in-law Sonia Gandhi.

 The Discovery of India by Pandit Jawaharlal Nehru, 
 The Discovery of India by Jawaharlal Nehru (paperback, thirteenth edition),

Adaptations
The book became the basis of the 53-episode Indian television series Bharat Ek Khoj (1988), directed by Shyam Benegal, first broadcast in 1988 on state-run Doordarshan channel.

See also
 Letters from a Father to His Daughter (1929)
 An Autobiography (1936)
 Glimpses of World History (1934)

References

Indian literature
Historiography of India
1946 non-fiction books
History books about India
Indian non-fiction books
Contemporary Indian philosophy
Oxford University Press books
Prison writings
20th-century Indian books
Non-fiction books adapted into television shows
Books by Jawaharlal Nehru
John Day Company books

External links
The Discovery of India.  First published by The Signet Press (1946).